Lips is a 2008 karaoke video game for the Xbox 360 developed by iNiS and published by Microsoft Game Studios.  The game's soundtrack is localized for different countries, though the versions share many tracks.  With the exception of the Scandinavian release, each version of the game contains 40 on-disc master tracks.  Lips also supports downloadable content through the Xbox Live Marketplace.

On-disc songs
The following is a list of songs that appear on-disc in any version of Lips.  Some songs are available on-disc in some locales and as downloadable content in others.  Other songs are only available in certain locales and cannot be downloaded.

References

External links
 Lips official site

Lips (video game)
Lips